Thomas Carleton (fl. 1597), of Carleton, Cumbria, was an English politician.

He was a Member (MP) of the Parliament of England for Morpeth in 1597. There is confusion over whether this MP was Thomas Carleton the father or Thomas Carleton the son.

References

Year of birth missing
Year of death missing
People from Cumberland
English MPs 1597–1598